Alta, West Virginia may refer to:
Alta, Fayette County, West Virginia, an unincorporated community in Fayette County, West Virginia
Alta, Greenbrier County, West Virginia, an unincorporated community in Greenbrier County, West Virginia